Robert Parker may refer to:

Sir Robert Parker, 1st Baronet (c. 1655–1691), English politician; Member of Parliament for Hastings, 1679–1685
Robert Parker, Baron Parker of Waddington (1857–1918), British law lord
Robert Parker (cricketer) (born 1942), Australian cricketer
Robert Parker (dancer), British dancer, principal dancer at Birmingham Royal Ballet
Robert Parker (historian) (born 1950), Wykeham Professor of Ancient History at Oxford University
Robert Parker (judge) (1796–1865), lawyer, judge and politician in New Brunswick
Robert Parker (minister) (1564–1614), English Puritan scholar and divine
Robert Parker (music producer), electronic musician from Stockholm, Sweden
Robert Parker (musician) (1847–1937), New Zealand organist, choirmaster and conductor
Robert Parker (singer) (1930–2020), American R&B singer
Robert Parker (sound engineer) (1936–2004), Australian sound engineer and broadcaster
Robert Parker (water polo) (born 1987), British water polo player
Robert A. Parker (born 1936), astronaut
Robert B. Parker (1932–2010), author of the Spenser detective novels
Robert C. Parker (born 1957), United States Coast Guard officer
Bob Parker (accounting scholar) (Robert Henry Parker, 1932–2016), British accounting scholar
R. Hunt Parker (1892–1969), American jurist
R. W. Parker (1912-1984), American football and track coach
Robert Ladislav Parker, American geophysicist and mathematician
Robert LeRoy Parker (1866–1908?), birth name of American outlaw Butch Cassidy
Robert Parker (wine critic) (born 1947), American wine critic
Robert Manley Parker (born 1937), American judge
Robert Townley Parker (1793–1879), British Member of Parliament for Preston
Robert Redmayne Parker (born 1954), Bowbearer of the Forest of Bowland
Robert W. Parker (composer) (born 1960), American composer
Robert Parker (coach) (1960.2021), American track and field coach
Robert W. Parker (general), U.S. Air Force general
Col. Robert Parker, ring name of wrestler Robert Fuller
Johnson v. Parker defendant, employer of John Casor

See also
Rob Parker (disambiguation)
Bobby Parker (disambiguation)
Bob Parker (disambiguation)
Bert Parker (disambiguation)